Francis Xavier Paul Healy (June 29, 1910 – February 12, 1997) was a Major League Baseball catcher who played in parts of four seasons for the New York Giants and St. Louis Cardinals. He made it into 15 games for the 1934 World Series winners, mostly as a pinch hitter, but did not play in the series.

Healy is the uncle of former MLB catcher and current broadcaster Fran Healy.

Sources

Major League Baseball catchers
New York Giants (NL) players
St. Louis Cardinals players
Bridgeport Bears (baseball) players
Columbus Red Birds players
Toledo Mud Hens players
Rochester Red Wings players
Memphis Chickasaws players
Houston Buffaloes players
Baseball players from Massachusetts
1910 births
1997 deaths